The 1992 BMW European Indoors was a women's tennis tournament played on indoor carpet courts at the Saalsporthalle Allmend in Zürich in Switzerland and was part of Tier II of the 1992 WTA Tour. It was the ninth edition of the tournament and was held from 5 October through 11 October 1992. First-seeded Steffi Graf won the singles title, her sixth at the event, and earned $70,000 first-prize money.

Finals

Singles
 Steffi Graf defeated  Martina Navratilova 2–6, 7–5, 7–5
 It was Graf's 6th singles title of the year and the 67th of her career.

Doubles
 Helena Suková /  Natasha Zvereva defeated  Martina Navratilova /  Pam Shriver 7–6(7–5), 6–4

References

External links
 ITF tournament edition details
 Tournament draws

European Indoors
Zurich Open
1992 in Swiss tennis